The 1906 Auburn Tigers football team represented Alabama Polytechnic Institute (now known Auburn University) as a member of the Southern Intercollegiate Athletic Association (SIAA) during the 1906 college football season.. The team was led by head coach Mike Donahue, in his third year, and played their home games at both the Drill Field in Auburn and West End Park in Birmingham, Alabama. They finished the season with a record of one win, five losses, and one tie (1–5–1 overall, 0–5 in the SIAA).

Schedule

References

Auburn
Auburn Tigers football seasons
Auburn Tigers football